David McDonald may refer to:

 David McDonald (astronomer) (born 1964), Irish amateur astronomer and discoverer of minor planets
 David McDonald (footballer) (born 1971), Irish footballer
 David Cargill McDonald, Canadian jurist who headed the Royal Commission of Inquiry into Certain Activities of the RCMP, better known as the McDonald Commission
 David J. McDonald (1902–1979), American labor leader and president of the United Steelworkers of America, 1952–1965
 David J. McDonald Jr. (born 1939), his son, professor of drama emeritus at University of California, Irvine
 David Tennant (born 1971 as David John McDonald), Scottish Actor; famous for portraying the Doctor in Doctor Who
 David L. McDonald (1906–1997), United States Navy admiral
 David McDonald (Prince Edward Island politician) (1862–1939), Speaker of the Legislature in Prince Edward Island, Canada, 1928–1931
 David McDonald (Wisconsin politician), member of the Wisconsin State Assembly
 David McDonald (judge) (1803–1869), United States federal judge
 David Wylie McDonald (1927–2007), Scottish architect and colonial civil servant
 Dave McDonald (baseball) (1943–2017), baseball player
 Dave McDonald (ice hockey) (born 1960), Canadian ice hockey player

See also 
 David MacDonald (disambiguation)